Oleksandr Serhiyovych Prokudin (born on 22 July 1983), is a Ukrainian politician, civil servant, and police officer who has been the Governor of Kherson Oblast since 7 February 2023.

Biography
Oleksandr Prokudin was born in Mykolaiv on 22 July 1983.

He was the head of the GUNP in the Kherson Oblast from September 2019 to February 12, 2023.

He also was the Head of the Department of the National Police of Ukraine from February 2022 to February 2023. On 7 February 2023, Prokudin became the Head of the Kherson Regional Military Administration.

References

1983 births
Living people
Politicians from Mykolaiv
Governors of Kherson Oblast